Chandrika Prasad Srivastava KCMG, ComIH, IAS (Retd.) (8 July 1920 – 22 July 2013) was an Indian civil servant, international administrator, and diplomat.

Biography
C.P. Srivastava was born on 8 July 1920 in a religious Chitraguptvanshi Kayastha family and was educated in Lucknow, India (BA, MA, LLB).  He started his career as a civil servant in India, entering the Indian Administrative Service, becoming a Joint Secretary to the Indian Prime Minister's office from 1964–1966, during the premiership of Lal Bahadur Shastri.

C.P. Srivastava became the first chief executive of the Shipping Corporation of India and in 1974 was elected to serve as the Secretary-General of the International Maritime Organization (IMO), a United Nations agency based in London, serving successive four-year terms as Secretary-General from 1974 to 1989. During this time he played a pioneering role in the establishment of the International Maritime Academy in Italy, and the International Maritime Law Institute in Malta. He was also the first Chancellor of the Sweden-based World Maritime University which was founded in 1983 to address a pressing need for maritime professionals in the developing world.

Awards

Academic honours
 In 1987 he was named an honorary graduate by the University of Wales
 Honorary LL.D from Bhopal (1984) and from Malta (1988)

National honours
 Padma Bhushan in 1972 in recognition of his contributions to establishing one of the most successful public sector undertakings in India.
 In 2005 he received the 2004 Lal Bahadur Shastri National Award for Excellence in Public Administration and Management Sciences by the then President of India, A.P.J. Abdul Kalam.
 In 2009, he was awarded the Padma Vibhushan, India's second highest civilian award, by the President of India.

Other state honours
 Order of Naval Merit Admiral Padilla of Colombia – 1978
 Great Friend of the Seas Award, Colombia – 1978
 Commander of the Order of Maritime Merit of France – 1982
 Commander of the Order of St. Olav of Norway – 1982
 Grand Officer of the Order of Merit of the Italian Republic – 1983
 Commander of the Order of Prince Henry of Portugal – 1983
 The Gold Order of Distinguished Seafarers, Poland – 1983
 Nautical Medal, 1st Class of Greece – 1983
 Grand Cross of the Order of the Peruvian Cross of Naval Merit – 1984
 Grand Cross of the Order of Manuel Amador Guerrero of Panama – 1985
 Grand Officer of the Order of Naval Merit of Brazil – 1986
 Commandery of the Order of Merit of the People's Republic of Poland – 1988 (now the Commander's Cross of the Order of Merit of Poland)
 Knight Grand Commander of the Humane Order of African Redemption of Liberia – 1989
 Commander's Cross of the Bundesverdienstkreuz – 1989
 Commander Grand Cross of the Order of the Polar Star of Sweden −1989
 Order of Merit of Egypt, 1st Grade – 1990
 In 1990, in recognition of his service and contribution to world shipping, Srivastava was conferred, by Elizabeth II, the title of Honorary Knight Commander of the Most Distinguished Order of Saint Michael and Saint George (KCMG)
 Commander By Number of the Order of Isabel the Catholic of Spain, 2nd Class – 1994
 Commander of the Naval Order of Admiral Padilla of Colombia – 2004

From organisations
 Gold Mercury International Award Ad Personam – 1984
 Award, Seatrade Academy – 1988
 Silver Medal of Honour of Malmo, Sweden – 1988
 In 1991, he received the International Maritime Prize from the International Maritime Organization for his contribution to their work and objectives.

Family
C.P. Srivastava was married to Nirmala Srivastava, the founder of Sahaja Yoga - a spiritual movement, based on an experience called "Self-realization". C.P. Srivastava has stated that: "his life has been greatly influenced by his wife and he has been motivated by her vision of one Almighty God and one human family". He has been motivated by this vision in all aspects of his life and believes it can be applied worldwide.

The couple had two daughters, Kalpana Srivastava and Sadhana Varma.

Relationship to Sahaja Yoga
Sir C.P. Srivastava  practised Sahaja Yoga, he has said it changes people from the core. He has described Sahaja Yoga practitioners as being miracles of transformation and displaying an angelic quality. He believed that the rapid spread of Sahaja Yoga is very important for the world.

References

Bibliography
 C.P. Srivastava, Lal Bahadur Shastri: a life of truth in politics (New Delhi: Oxford University Press, 1995) 
 C.P. Srivastava, Corruption: India's enemy within (New Delhi: Macmillan India, 2001) 
 C.P. Srivastava, Speech in Sydney, Australia (2006)

External links

Dr Chandrika Prasad Srivastava – ‘a living legend of the maritime world’
IMO Secretary-General Emeritus Dr. C.P. Srivastava, KCMG, remembered

1920 births
2013 deaths
Honorary Knights Commander of the Order of St Michael and St George
Indian Civil Service (British India) officers
Indian diplomats
Recipients of the Padma Bhushan in civil service
Recipients of the Padma Vibhushan in civil service
International Maritime Organization people
Recipients of the Order of Merit (Egypt)
Recipients of the Order of Naval Merit (Brazil)
Commanders Crosses of the Order of Merit of the Federal Republic of Germany
Indian Administrative Service officers
Indian officials of the United Nations